Lance "Un" Rivera is an American film director, film producer, screenwriter, record producer, and music executive.

Career
Lance Rivera began his music career when he met a neighborhood rapper named Christopher Wallace, who rhymed under the name, The Notorious B.I.G. After hearing him perform, Rivera offered to finance his musical career.

Undeas Recordings and Untertainment 
In 1994, when Undeas Recordings was created in partnership with Atlantic Records, Rivera was put in charge of its roster, which included The Notorious B.I.G.'s protégé group Junior M.A.F.I.A., including its core member, Lil' Kim. Junior M.A.F.I.A. released only one album under Undeas/Atlantic, 1995's Conspiracy, which went gold in under a month and sustained two singles: "Player's Anthem" and "Get Money"; both of which gained way for Lil' Kim's breakout solo career. That following year, on November 12, 1996, Undeas released Kim's debut solo album, Hard Core, which included the singles, "No Time", "Crush on You" and "Not Tonight". All of which became top-ten Billboard hits and helped the album reached the top fifteen of the Billboard 200 at number eleven.

In 1997,  Rivera launched another label called Untertainment Records. The label's roster included Harlem rapper Cam'ron and Philadelphia rappers Dutch and Spade of Major Figgas and Charli Baltimore; Cam'ron and Charli Baltimore were signed through Epic Records while Dutch and Spade were signed to Interscope Records. The label's first release was the soundtrack to the 1998 comedy film, Woo. Only Cam'ron released two albums under that label: 1998's Confessions of Fire and 2000's S.D.E.. In July 1999, Junior M.A.F.I.A. member Lil' Cease released a solo album under Undeas, The Wonderful World of Cease A Leo. Eventually, vice versa, fellow Junior M.A.F.I.A. affiliate Lil' Kim released her sophomore solo album, The Notorious K.I.M., almost a year later in June 2000 (also under Undeas). Despite the Notorious K.I.M. being the final album released under Undeas and it going platinum in under two months, Rivera was in no way involved in this project. After losing Untertainment artist Charli Baltimore, Rivera attempted a comeback in the music business with the release of Major Figgas' Dutch and Spade's collaborative single, "If You Want It". However, after the single failed to chart, the duo's album, For My Family, originally planned for a November 2001 release, was shelved.

Movie career 
Rivera transitioned from music to doing movies. He teamed up with Queen Latifah and her Flavor Unit partner, Shakim Compere, to establish Crossover Media, a marketing advertising company. He went on to make his feature film directorial debut with The Cookout (2004), starring Queen Latifah, as well as Tim Meadows, Ja Rule, Eve, Jenifer Lewis, Danny Glover and Storm P in an all-star cast. The film opened on 1,303 screens, and opened at number eight in the box office with a gross of $5,000,900. After seven weeks, it ended with a domestic gross of $11,814,019 and made $195,051 from foreign countries, for a total of $12,009,070 worldwide.

His second film, The Perfect Holiday, released in November 2007 and also starring Queen Latifah (alongside Morris Chestnut, Charlie Murphy, and Gabrielle Union) opened at number six with $2.2 million; The film grossed $5.8 million domestically.

In early 2014, Rivera reunited with Cam'ron (who co-wrote the screenplay) for the production of the direct-to-media film, Percentage, which also co-starred Omar Gooding.

Personal life

1999 stabbing incident 
On December 2, 1999, Rivera was stabbed by hip-hop entrepreneur Jay-Z at the release party for Q-Tip's album Amplified at the now-closed Kit Kat Club in Times Square. The incident arose over the alleged bootlegging of Jay-Z's album Vol. 3... Life and Times of S. Carter before its release on December 28. In October 2001, Jay-Z pleaded guilty to a second-degree assault charge and was sentenced to three years of probation.

Filmography

References

External links
 
 
  The Cookout Box Office
  Lance Rivera Bio

Film producers from New York (state)
American male screenwriters
American music video directors
Record producers from New York (state)
Film directors from New York City
Living people
Screenwriters from New York (state)
Year of birth missing (living people)
People from Brooklyn
People from Harlem